Howard C. Bare (November 23, 1911 — July 13, 2002) was an attorney. He was the mayor of Lancaster, Pennsylvania for eight months from 1950 to 1951 during the period when his brother Kendig C. Bare, elected mayor in 1950, was in military service in the Korean War.

References

1911 births
2002 deaths
Mayors of Lancaster, Pennsylvania
20th-century American politicians